Suangna (also, Shua-vit, Suagna, and Suang-na) is a former Tongva (Gabrieleño) Native American settlement in Los Angeles County, California. There is a plaque set in stone commemorating the village in Carson.

It may have also been referred to as Swaanga, which was recorded as one of the largest villages in the region. Evidence of the village may have still been recognizable as late as 1852. A local historian in the area provided a potential location as "the side of the hill above what is now Anaheim Street between the Harbor Freeway and Gaffey Street. Silka adds that the village was located near a crossing of major Native American trails, which today is located at the intersection of Gaffey and Anaheim Streets, Vermont Avenue and Palos Verdes Drive North, commonly called Five Points."

However, others place the village at a different location.

See also
Category: Tongva populated places
Tongva language
Ranchos of California
Spanish missions in California

References

Former settlements in Los Angeles County, California
Former Native American populated places in California
Former populated places in California
Tongva populated places